Count Agenor Maria Adam Gołuchowski (25 March 184928 March 1921) was a Polish statesman who inherited much of his father's wealth. Between 1895 and 1906 he served as the Minister of Foreign Affairs of Austria-Hungary. He was responsible for a period of détente in Austrian relations with Imperial Russia, harmed due to the Austrian and Russian struggle for control of the Bosporus. From 1907 he headed the Polish Group in the Herrenhaus, the upper chamber of the Austrian parliament.

Early life
He was a son of Count Agenor Gołuchowski, who descended from an old and noble Polish family, was governor of Galicia. His brother, Adam Gołuchowski, was also an MP and Marshal of Galicia.

Entering the diplomatic service, the son was in 1872 appointed attaché to the Austrian embassy in Berlin, where he became secretary of legation, and thence he was transferred to Paris. After rising to the rank of counsellor of legation, he was in 1887 made minister at Bucharest, where he remained until 1893.

Career

In these positions he acquired a great reputation as a firm and skilful diplomatist, and on the retirement of Count Kálnoky in May 1895 was chosen to succeed him as Austro-Hungarian minister for foreign affairs. The appointment of a Pole caused some surprise in view of the importance of Austrian relations with Russia (then rather strained) and Germany, but the choice was justified by events. In his speech of that year to the delegations he declared the maintenance of the Triple Alliance, and in particular the closest intimacy with Germany, to be the keystone of Austrian policy; at the same time he dwelt on the traditional friendship between Austria and Great Britain and expressed his desire for a good understanding with all the powers. In pursuance of this policy he effected an understanding with Russia, by which neither power was to exert any separate influence in the Balkan peninsula, and thus removed a long-standing cause of friction.

This understanding was formally ratified during a visit to Saint Petersburg, on which he accompanied the emperor in April 1897. He took the lead in establishing the European concert during the Armenian massacres of 1896, and again resisted isolated action on the part of any of the great powers during the Cretan troubles and the Greco-Turkish War. In November 1897, when the Austro-Hungarian flag was insulted at Mersina, he threatened to bombard the town if instant reparation were not made, and by his firm attitude greatly enhanced Austrian prestige in the East. In his speech to the delegations in 1898 he dwelt on the necessity of expanding Austria's mercantile marine, and of raising the fleet to a strength which, while not vying with the fleets of the great naval powers, would ensure respect for the Austrian flag wherever her interests needed protection. He also hinted at the necessity for European combination to resist American competition.

The understanding with Russia in the matter of the Balkan states temporarily endangered friendly relations with Italy, who thought her interests threatened, until Gołuchowski guaranteed in 1898 the existing order. He further encouraged a good understanding with Italy by personal conferences with the Italian foreign minister, Tommaso Tittoni, in 1904 and 1905.

Count Lamsdorff visited Vienna in December 1902, when arrangements were made for concerted action in imposing on the sultan reforms in the government of Macedonia. Further steps were taken (the Mürzsteg reforms) after Gołuchowski's interview with the tsar at Mürzsteg in 1903, and two civil agents representing the countries were appointed for two years to ensure the execution of the promised reforms. This period was extended in 1905, when Gołuchowski was the chief mover in forcing the Porte, by an international naval demonstration at Mitylene, to accept financial control by the powers in Macedonia. At the Algeciras Conference assembled to settle the First Moroccan Crisis, Austria supported the German position, and after the close of the conferences the emperor Wilhelm II of Germany telegraphed to Gołuchowski: "You have proved yourself a brilliant second on the duelling ground and you may feel certain of like services from me in similar circumstances". This pledge was redeemed in 1908, when Germany's support of Austria in the Balkan crisis proved conclusive.

By the Hungarians, however, Gołuchowski was hated; he was suspected of having inspired the emperor's opposition to the use of Magyar in the Hungarian army, and was made responsible for the slight offered to the Magyar deputation by Franz Joseph I of Austria in September 1905. So long as he remained in office there was no hope of arriving at a settlement of a matter which threatened the disruption of the Dual Monarchy, and on the 11 October 1906 he was forced to resign.

From 1895, he was also a conservative member of the Herrenhaus (House of Lords) of the Imperial Parliament in Vienna, and from 1907 was chairman of the influential “Poland Block,” the group of Polish members.

Once Congress Poland had been conquered in the First World War, he supported the ‘Austrian solution', that is joining Congress Poland to Austria, thus marinating the ‘dual’ (Austria and Hungary) monarchy, as opposed to the  ‘tripartite’ solution of uniting Congress Poland with Austrian Galicia as a third constituent part of a Triple Monarchy (Austria, Hungary, and Poland).

Personal life
Gołuchowski was married to Princess Anna Napoléona Karolina Alexandrine Murat (1863–1940), a daughter of Joachim, 4th Prince Murat and the former Malcy Louise Caroline Berthier de Wagram and younger sister of Joachim, 5th Prince Murat.  Princess Anna was a granddaughter of Lucien, 3rd Prince Murat, himself the second son of Gen. Joachim Murat, who married Napoleon's sister, Caroline Bonaparte, and was made King of Naples. They were the parents of:

 Agenor Maria Gołuchowski (1886–1956), who married Countess Matylda Baworów-Bawarowska, a daughter of Count Rudolf Bawarów-Bawarowski.
 Wojciech Maria Agenor Gołuchowski (1888–1960), who married Countess Sophie Marie Czesława Baworów-Baworowska, a daughter of Count Michael Viktor Anton Baworów-Baworowska.
 Karol Gołuchowski

He died in Lwów on 29 March 1921.

Honours
He received the following orders and decorations:

Notes

References

1849 births
1921 deaths
Politicians from Lviv
People from the Kingdom of Galicia and Lodomeria
Finance ministers of Austria-Hungary
Foreign ministers of Austria-Hungary
Members of the House of Lords (Austria)
Counts of Austria
Counts of Poland
Diplomats from Lviv
Knights of the Golden Fleece of Austria
Grand Crosses of the Order of Saint Stephen of Hungary
Commanders of the Order of Franz Joseph
Knights of the Order of Saint Joseph
Bailiffs Grand Cross of Honour and Devotion of the Sovereign Military Order of Malta
Honorary Knights Grand Cross of the Royal Victorian Order
Knights Grand Cross of the Order of St Gregory the Great
Grand Crosses of the Order of the Star of Romania
Grand Crosses of the Order of the Crown (Romania)
Recipients of the Order of the Rising Sun with Paulownia Flowers
Commandeurs of the Légion d'honneur
Officiers of the Ordre des Palmes Académiques